Rosolini is a comune (municipality) in the Province of Syracuse, 
Sicily, southern Italy. Rosolini was a town in feudal times, and was a settlement in the late Imperial Roman and Byzantine Ages. In the 15th century, Rosolini was a fief of the Platamones. It was the Moncadas, in the year of 1713, which founded the newer town of Rosolini which we see today.

Rosolini borders the following municipalities: Ispica, Modica, Noto, Ragusa.

References

External links
 Official website

Cities and towns in Sicily
Municipalities of the Province of Syracuse